Cyril Walter Lloyd Jones (1881, Wandsworth, London–1981, Surrey) was an English railway engineer, joined the Nizam's State Railways (NSR) in 1904 and was associated with NSR for until 1934.

Books
 Memoirs of Cyril Jones: People, Society and Railways in Hyderabad, by-Omar Khalidi, Publisher-South Asia Books (2010).

References

External links
 Cyril Lloyd Jones
 HH the Nizam's Railway, Poosapally gorge.

1881 births
1981 deaths
English railway mechanical engineers
Railway officers in British India